is a Japanese actor who is affiliated with Ohta Production. He graduated from Komazawa University. He played the role of Kouta Bitou (Hurricane Yellow) in the 2002 Super Sentai TV series Ninpuu Sentai Hurricaneger.

Biography
Yamamoto was born in Okayama Prefecture, on December 23, 1980. In 2002, he appeared in Ninpuu Sentai Hurricaneger as Kouta Bitou/Hurricane Yellow. In 2005, he starred in the film, Last Dance of August Jitsu the 5th. In 2011, Yamamoto appeared in Kaizoku Sentai Gokaiger as Kouta Bitou/Hurricane Yellow for the first time in seven years with Shun Shioya and Nao Nagasawa.

At the edge that he was co-starring in Hurricaneger, Yamamoto had a friendship with Ryuichiro Nishioka and Yujiro Shirakawa, and had activities such as working for the clothing brand Anunnaki.

In a live event Yellow Festival in Loft Plus One, he was served with Shuhei Izumi, who played Time Yellow in Mirai Sentai Timeranger. Yamamoto had also appeared in other events at Osaka Jungle. He and Izumi, had a private friendship and spent together from New Year's Eve of 2008 until New Year's Day of 2009.

Personal life
Yamamoto married on January 15, 2009 and had a daughter on July 21. He also had a second daughter who was born on April 8, 2013.

Filmography

TV series

References

External links
 Official profile at Ohta Production 
 Kohei Yamamoto's official website 
 Official profile at Act League 

Japanese male actors
Komazawa University alumni
1980 births
Living people
Actors from Okayama Prefecture